The Fuzhou–Xiamen high-speed railway will run between Fuzhou, Xiamen and Zhangzhou in Fujian Province, China.

History
In 2015, it was announced that a second high-speed railway line between Fuzhou, Xiamen and Zhangzhou would be constructed, as the existing Fuzhou–Xiamen railway was at capacity.

Construction began in 2017. It is expected to open in late 2023.

Route
The high-speed railway runs parallel to the existing Fuzhou–Xiamen railway which opened in 2010. The expected journey time between Fuzhou and Xiamen is one hour.

The project includes a new depot which is being constructed north of Xiamen North railway station.

Stations

References

High-speed railway lines in China
High-speed railway lines under construction